Maria Neacșu (born 27 September 1999) is a Romanian footballer who plays as a midfielder for Liga I club ACS Fortuna Becicherecu Mic the Romania women's national team.

References

External links

1999 births
Living people
Women's association football midfielders
Romanian women's footballers
Romania women's international footballers
FCU Olimpia Cluj players